La Jalousie (Jealousy) is a 1957 novel by Alain Robbe-Grillet. The French title: "la jalousie" is a play on words that can be translated as "jealousy", but also as "the jalousie window". The jealous husband in the novel spies on his wife through the Venetian blind-like slats of the jalousie windows of their home.

La Jalousie is one of critics' and literary theorists' main examples of Robbe-Grillet's demonstrations of his concept of the nouveau roman, for which he later explicitly advocated in his 1963 Pour un nouveau roman (For a New Novel).

Robbe-Grillet argued that the novel was constructed along the lines of an "absent" third-person narrator. In that account of the novel, the narrator, a jealous husband, silently observes the interactions of his wife (referred to only as "A...") and a neighbour, Franck. The silent narrator, who never names himself (and whose presence is merely inferred, e.g. by the number of place settings at the dinner table or deck chairs on the verandah) is extremely suspicious that A... is having an affair with Franck. Throughout the novel, he continually replays his observations and suspicions (that is, created scenarios about A... and Franck), so much so that it becomes impossible to distinguish moments that are observed from those that are merely suspected.

La Jalousie was a critical success but commercially disappointing. The novel was considered for television adaptations by the BBC but ultimately discounted.

References

Bibliography 

 

1957 French novels
Novels by Alain Robbe-Grillet
Metafictional novels